Tătaru River may refer to:
 Tătaru, a tributary of the Buzăiel in Brașov County, Romania
 Tătaru, a tributary of the Ialomița in Dâmbovița County, Romania